Acacia gloeotricha is a shrub belonging to the genus Acacia and the subgenus Juliflorae that is endemic to north western Australia.

Description
Like most species of Acacia it has phyllodes rather than true leaves. It blooms in June producing yellow flowers. The brown crustaceous seed pods that form after flowering have a linear shape and are raised over the seeds.

Distribution
It is native to an area in the Kimberley region of Western Australia where it has a limited range within the Wunaamin Miliwundi Ranges where it grows in sandy soils over a sandstone substrate.

See also
 List of Acacia species

References

gloeotricha
Acacias of Western Australia
Plants described in 1999
Taxa named by Bruce Maslin